Beverly Farms station is an MBTA Commuter Rail station in the Beverly Farms village of Beverly, Massachusetts. Located at the intersection of Oak Street and West Street, it serves the Newburyport/Rockport Line. The 1898-built station building is still present but no longer used for railroad purposes. The station has two side platforms serving the line's two tracks, each with a mini-high section to make the station accessible.

History

The Eastern Railroad opened its Gloucester Branch to Manchester on August 3, 1847, and to Gloucester on December 1. An intermediate station was located at West Beach (West Street at Hale Street). It was a flag stop established by Eastern Railroad president David A. Neal, an early resident of the village of Beverly Farms.

In 1898, the Boston and Maine Railroad replaced it with a larger hip-roofed depot. The ticket office in the station building closed on February 22, 1952. The freight house was demolished the year after. The station building was closed in 1958 and renovated for commercial use. A group of friends paid $8,000 for the building and spent $22,000 to convert it for use as a country store. A travel agency began using the space in 1962. It was used as a country store by 1977.

References

External links

 MBTA - Beverly Farms
 View of station on Google Maps Street View

MBTA Commuter Rail stations in Essex County, Massachusetts
Stations along Boston and Maine Railroad lines
Railway stations in the United States opened in 1847